Synanthedon africana is a moth of the family Sesiidae. It is known from the African country of Togo.

References

Sesiidae
Fauna of Togo
Moths of Africa
Moths described in 1917